Nathalie Bernard (born 17 August 1985) is a South African-born New Zealand former swimmer, who specialised in freestyle events. She is a single-time Olympian (2004), and a member of North Shore Swim Club in Auckland, under head coach Thomas Ansorg.

Bernard qualified for the women's 4 × 200 m freestyle relay, as a member of the New Zealand team, at the 2004 Summer Olympics in Athens. Teaming with Helen Norfolk, Alison Fitch, and Rebecca Linton in heat two, Bernard recorded a split of 2:07.00 to anchor the last 50 metres. She and the rest of the Kiwis finished the race in seventh place and thirteenth overall in a final time of 8:14.76.

References

External links

1985 births
Living people
New Zealand female swimmers
Olympic swimmers of New Zealand
Swimmers at the 2004 Summer Olympics
New Zealand female freestyle swimmers
South African emigrants to New Zealand
Swimmers from Johannesburg
Swimmers from Auckland